Liu Shyh-fang (or Liu Shih-fang; ; born 15 August 1959) is a Taiwanese politician. She graduated from the Oklahoma State University and is a member of the Democratic Progressive Party. She was deputy secretary-general of the office of President Chen Shui-bian.

Early life
Liu obtained her bachelor's degree in chemical engineering from Tamkang University and master's degree in environmental engineering from Oklahoma State University in the United States.

See also
 List of members of the ninth Legislative Yuan

References

1959 births
Democratic Progressive Party Members of the Legislative Yuan
Oklahoma State University alumni
Tamkang University alumni
Living people
21st-century Taiwanese women politicians
Members of the 9th Legislative Yuan
Kaohsiung Members of the Legislative Yuan
Members of the 10th Legislative Yuan